Mandollia is a genus of leaf beetles in the subfamily Eumolpinae, found in Africa. Two of its species were originally placed in Rhembastus.

Species

 Mandollia affinis (Jacoby, 1900)
 Mandollia isoensis Selman, 1972
 Mandollia semibrunneus (Jacoby, 1901)

References

Eumolpinae
Chrysomelidae genera
Beetles of Africa